Maurice Lacroix is a Swiss luxury watchmaker based in the Canton of Jura and headquartered in Zürich.

History
Maurice Lacroix was founded as part of Desco von Schulthess of Zürich in 1975. Founded in 1889, Desco von Schulthess (Desco) is an older company with roots in the silk trade. Since 1946, Desco has also been a representative for luxury watches including Audemars Piguet, Heuer, Eterna, and Jaeger-LeCoultre. Over the years, Desco became more interested in the watch business, and in 1961 Desco acquired an assembly facility named Tiara in Saignelégier, in the Swiss Canton of Jura. There it produced private label watches for third parties. In 1975, Desco started marketing watches under the brand name Maurice Lacroix. There was a member on the board of Desco von Schulthess, parent & founding company of Maurice Lacroix, who was named Mr. Lacroix.

By 1980, Maurice Lacroix had become so successful that the facility in Saignelégier ceased production for third parties. In 1989 Maurice Lacroix acquired the casemaker Queloz S.A., also based in Saignelégier. This ability to produce watch cases in-house makes Maurice Lacroix unusual compared to other luxury watch companies.

During the 1990s, Maurice Lacroix experienced a "rocket-like ascent" with the launch of their high end "Les Mécaniques" line, later renamed the "Masterpiece" line. During this time, the company elevated itself to the high ranks of Swiss watch manufactures, by both maintaining traditional 'Swiss watch-making art' and by creating their own movements for its Masterpiece Collection.

As of 2010, Maurice Lacroix, has a total of approximately 220 employees worldwide, and is represented in around 4,000 shops in more than 60 countries all over the world.

Masterpiece watches
The "Les Mécaniques" / "Masterpiece" line includes limited edition models based on "historic" or "heritage" movements purchased during the height of the quartz crisis and refinished to the highest standards. Of particular note are the alarm wristwatches, chronographs, and jump hour Masterpiece watches Maurice Lacroix produced based on heritage movements. In addition, this line includes watches based on extensively modified ébauches from ETA, Unitas, and others that incorporate numerous complications, including retrograde movements, power reserve indicators, and calendar modules.

Manufacture movements
In 2006, Maurice Lacroix introduced their first full in-house movement, the ML106 based "Masterpiece Le Chronographe." Since then, Maurice Lacroix has introduced numerous manufacture movements including an automatic movement in 2011. The shift to manufacture movements has been accompanied by an increase in the size of the watches and a shift to a more "modern" or "industrial" look.

Sponsorships
In 2010, Maurice Lacroix collaborated with Internet entrepreneur Jimmy Wales, musician Bob Geldof, actor Ray Stevenson, swimmer James Magnussen, diver Orlando Duque, South Korean actor Jang Dong-gun and British golfer Justin Rose on a brand endorsement campaign. In 2019, the company collaborated with car manufacturer Kia to provide clocks for the Kia K9 sedan.

Maurice Lacroix is also the official watch partner of FC Barcelona and Red Bull Cliff Diving World Series.

In 2018, Maurice Lacroix started a program "Friends of the Brand" and they have signed a sponsoring agreement with the #1 team of basketball 3x3 in Switzerland, Team Lausanne.

See also 
List of watch manufacturers

References

External links 

Official site

Swiss watch brands
Luxury brands
Watch manufacturing companies of Switzerland
Manufacturing companies established in 2001